Jadwin is an unincorporated community in southern Dent County, Missouri, United States. It is located at the intersection of Missouri routes K and BB  approximately eleven miles south of Salem and six miles east of Montauk State Park.

A post office called Jadwin has been in operation since 1875. The community has the name of J. A. Jadwin, an early settler.

References

Unincorporated communities in Dent County, Missouri
Unincorporated communities in Missouri